MS Fram is a passenger vessel operated by the Norway-based Hurtigruten Group. The ship is named after the original Fram, the ship used by explorers Fridtjof Nansen and Roald Amundsen. The ship operates in the Arctic Ocean and around Greenland in the summer, and cruises around Antarctica at other times of the year. In December 2007, the ship lost power and struck a glacier in Antarctica, sustaining damage to the starboard side; the collision did not affect the ship's seaworthiness.

References

Notes

Bibliography

External links 

MS Fram at Hurtigruten.us

2006 ships
Ships built in Italy
Ships built by Fincantieri
Passenger ships of Norway
Merchant ships of Norway